Karolina Nowakowska (born 17 May 1982 in Warsaw) is a Polish actress, dancer and vocalist. Known primarily with the role of Olga in the M jak miłość. She played among others in the city law, Pitbull 2, Na wspólnej, Kryminalni. She is a graduate of the Higher School of Journalism M. Wankowicz and music school. Then she studied acting in school at Warsaw's Jewish Theater.
Carolina as a dancer in step won, among others Champion of the Czech Republic (1996), the Champion of Poland (1999) and the Polish Cup (2001). From 7 March to 25 April took part in the second edition of the Stars dancing on ice. Her partner was Filip Bernadowski. Dropped out in the 7th section, covering 6 place. From 6 September to 6 December 2008, she participated in the fourth edition of the program Jak oni śpiewają(Soapstar Superstar), taking second place.

Filmography 

 Mięso (Ironica) (1993) as dziewczynka w stroju komunijnym
 Decyzja należy do ciebie (1999) as Anielka
 Policjanci (1999) as Bożenka
 To my (2000) as herself
 Kariera Nikosia Dyzmy (2002)
 Kasia i Tomek (2002–2003) as Uczestniczka prezentacji kosmetyków
 Samo Życie (2002–2008) as Joasia, recepcjonista w redakcji gazety 'Samo Życie'
 Lokatorzy (2003) as panna młoda, klientka restauracji Jacka
 Na Wspólnej (2003–2008) as a wife of Damian
 Zostać miss 2 (2003) as Magda "Komandoska"
 Dziki (2004)
 Kryminalni (2004–2008) as Barmanka/Sabina, żona Łukasza Czecha
 Klinika samotnych serc (2005) as Gabi, modelka
 Pogromczynie mitów (2005) as Ankietowana
 Pitbull (2005–2008) as Prosecutor
 M jak Miłość (2007–2008) as Olga Jankowska, girlfriend of Kuba
 Prawo miasta (2007) as recepcjonistka w firmie Woytowicza

Teatr TV 

 Portret słabego pianisty (1994) as Ola
 Blues (1999) as Girl

Polish dubbing 
 Szóstka w pracy (2004)
 Battle B-Daman (2005) as Karat

External links
 Official site of Karolina Nowakowska

Living people
1982 births
Polish actresses